Eremocarya  is a genus of flowering plants in the family Boraginaceae. There are about 63 species and its native range extends through western United States to northwestern Mexico. It is part of subtribe of Amsinckiinae.

It was once thought to be an either a subgenus or synonym of Cryptantha , before being segregated out due to molecular phylogenetic analysis.

Description
A profusely branching annual herb with very slender, ascending, nearly leafless stems and the leaves are arranged in a basal rosette. The roots and the lower parts of the stems are often stained with a red, or purple hue.
The flowers in March–June, are dense racemes, spiciform (spike-shaped) with evenly spaced, leafy-bracteate beneath each flower. The calyx is small and divided into 5 sections from the base. It has a small white corolla.
It has 4 ovules and 4 nutlets (which appear after flowering), which are similar in size and shape. The gynobase (a short conical or flat elevation of the receptacle of a flower, bearing the gynoecium) is thin and columnar, they are nearly similar (in form) to the wide style, which is dilated and wider that the stigma when in fruit.

Taxonomy
The Latin specific epithet Eremocarya is derived from "Eremos" which is Greek for "desert" or "lonely" and "caryum" is Greek for "nut".

It was first published by Edward Lee Greene in Pittonia vol.1 on page 58 in 1887.

Then in 1924, Ivan M. Johnston wrote that the genus of Oreocarya could be combined with Cryptantha. Edwin Blake Payson in 1927 (A Monograph of the section Oreocarya of Cryptantha, Ann. Mo. Bot. Gard. 14:211-358) agreed with Johnston and he had four sections in
Cryptantha: Eucryptantha (= Cryptantha), Geocarya, Krynitzkia (inclusive of Eremocarya, Greeneocharis, and Johnstonella), and Oreocarya.
Larry Higgins (1971), another expert on the perennial taxa, published a revised monograph of Oreocarya, and agreed with Johnston and Payson on the
inclusion of Oreocarya within Cryptantha, but also elevating the four sections of Johnston (1927) and Payson (1927) to subgenera. Although they were sometimes still called synonyms of Cryptantha.

In 2012, the phylogenetic relationship of members of the genus Cryptantha was carried out, based on dna sequencing analyses, it was then
proposed that the resurrection of the following genera Eremocarya, Greeneocharis, Johnstonella, and also Oreocarya.

Species
2 accepted species;
 Eremocarya lepida 
 Eremocarya micrantha 

In 2016, a large flowered version of Eremocarya micrantha was found and published as E. micrantha var. pseudolepida.

Distribution
The genus is found in the United States (within the states of Arizona, California, Nevada, New Mexico, Oregon, Texas and Utah) and also in north western Mexico.

Habitat

References

Other sources
 Cronquist, A. et al. 1972-. Intermountain flora.
 Johnston, I. M. 1927. Studies in the Boraginaceae VI. A revision of the South American Boraginoideae. Contr. Gray Herb. 78:31.

Boraginoideae
Boraginaceae genera
Plants described in 1887
Flora of the Northwestern United States
Flora of the Southwestern United States
Flora of the South-Central United States
Flora of Northwestern Mexico